Wells Stoughton Dickinson (August 16, 1828 Bangor, Franklin County, New York – January 19, 1892 Malone, Franklin Co., NY) was an American merchant, manufacturer and politician from New York.

Life
He was the son of Joshua Dickinson. He attended the common schools and Franklin Academy, and eventually he became a merchant. In 1851, he married Thusa Fish. He manufactured potato starch, and owned sawmills and gristmills.

He was a Supervisor of the Town of Bangor in from 1857 to 1859, a member of the New York State Assembly (Franklin Co.) in 1860, a delegate to the 1864 Republican National Convention, and a member of the New York State Senate (17th D.) from 1872 to 1875, sitting in the 95th,  96th, 97th and 98th New York State Legislatures.

Afterwards, he was the agent of the Northern Pacific Railway in charge of marketing the company's lands and building towns in the Dakota Territory.

Dickinson, North Dakota, was named after him.

Sources
 Life Sketches of Executive Officers and Members of the Legislature of the State of New York by William H. McElroy & Alexander McBride (1873; pg. 65ff) [e-book]
 Main Street, North Dakota in Vintage Postcards by Geneva Roth Olstad (Arcadia Publishing, 2000; pg. 27)
 Bio transcribed from Historical Sketches of Franklin County by Frederick J. Seaver (1918)

1828 births
1892 deaths
Republican Party New York (state) state senators
People from Bangor, New York
Republican Party members of the New York State Assembly
19th-century American railroad executives
19th-century American politicians